Korubo may refer to:

 Korubo people
 Korubo language